Kangaroo Flat is a locality northwest of Gawler in South Australia. It is on the Gawler to Mallala road in the vicinity of the turnoff to Roseworthy College and Wasleys. The locality used to have a school (opened 1902), Methodist church and a debating club, but these are now closed.

References